Francis Wang Xueming (October 4, 1910 – February 10, 1997) was a Chinese Catholic priest and Archbishop of the Roman Catholic Archdiocese of Suiyuan between 1951 and 1997. He was a member of the 6th and 7th National Committee of the Chinese People's Political Consultative Conference.

Biography

He was ordained a priest on July 28, 1935. On August 19, 1951, the Holy See appointed him as Archbishop of the Roman Catholic Archdiocese of Suiyuan to replace Louis Morel, who resigned. He was consecrated on October 7.

Wang died on February 10, 1997, aged 86.

References

1910 births
1997 deaths
People from Ordos City
20th-century Roman Catholic bishops in China
Members of the 6th Chinese People's Political Consultative Conference
Members of the 7th Chinese People's Political Consultative Conference